The Robinson executive council was 8th executive council of British Ceylon. The government was led by Governor Hercules Robinson.

Executive council members

See also
 Cabinet of Sri Lanka

Notes

References

1865 establishments in Ceylon
1872 disestablishments in Ceylon
Cabinets established in 1865
Cabinets disestablished in 1872
Ceylonese executive councils
Ministries of Queen Victoria